Naqdi or Noqdi, also rendered as Naghdi or Nugdi or Noqdeh, may refer to:
 Naqdi-ye Olya, Ardabil Province
 Naqdi-ye Sofla, Ardabil Province
 Naqdi Rural District, in Ardabil Province
 Noqadi, East Azerbaijan Province
 Naqdi, Hamadan